Cammell Laird Social Club is the ninth album released by Birkenhead-based UK rock band Half Man Half Biscuit, in September 2002.

Critical reception 
 Stewart Mason, AllMusic: "Cammell Laird Social Club is proof that for all their supposed indolence, Half Man Half Biscuit remain one of the sharpest and most satisfying bands in the U.K. indie scene".

Track listing

Notes 
 The album title parodies those of the film and album Buena Vista Social Club, a 1999 project by Ry Cooder about a group of Cuban musicians
 Cammell Laird, formerly a major shipbuilder, is a company located in Birkenhead.
 Cammell Laird Social Club is a working men's club located in Rock Ferry, near Birkenhead.
 "The Light at the End of the Tunnel (Is the Light of an Oncoming Train)" is a near-quotation from the poem "Since 1939" by the American poet Robert Lowell: "If we see light at the end of the tunnel, it's the light of an oncoming train".
 San Antonio is a town in Ibiza, Spain known for its clubbing scene.
 A foam party is a social event in which participants dance to music on a floor covered in several feet of foam.
 "If I Had Possession over Pancake Day" parodies the song "If I Had Possession over Judgment Day" by bluesman Robert Johnson.
 The title "She's in Broadstairs" parodies that of the 1983 song by "She's in Parties" by Bauhaus.
 Broadstairs is a quaint seaside resort near Ramsgate in Kent, England.
 Tyrol is a region of Austria.
 Paradise Lost is an epic poem by John Milton, published 1667.
 The title "Thy Damnation Slumbereth Not"  is a quotation from Thomas Hardy's novel Tess of the d'Urbervilles; which is itself an adaptation of the Second Epistle of Peter at 2:3: "Their damnation slumbereth not".
 Stavanger is the fourth largest city in Norway.

References

External links 
 Cammell Laird Social Club at the longest-established Half Man Half Biscuit fan site
 Cammell Laird Social Club at the Half Man Half Biscuit Lyrics Project

2002 albums
Half Man Half Biscuit albums